Biryuch is the name of several inhabited localities in Russia.

Urban localities
Biryuch, a town in Krasnogvardeysky District of Belgorod Oblast

Rural localities
Biryuch, Krasnogvardeysky District, Belgorod Oblast, a settlement in Krasnogvardeysky District of Belgorod Oblast
Biryuch, Valuysky District, Belgorod Oblast, a selo in Valuysky District of Belgorod Oblast
Biryuch, Voronezh Oblast, a selo in Biryuchenskoye Rural Settlement of Talovsky District in Voronezh Oblast